Charles Derber is an American Professor of Sociology at Boston College. Derber's work focuses on the crises of capitalism, globalization, corporate power, American militarism, the culture of hegemony, the climate crisis, and the new peace and global justice movements. Derber is persuaded that the overwhelming economic and cultural power of global corporations, increasingly melded with the political and military hegemonic power of the American government and the crises of global capitalism and global climate change, are together an integrated crisis that is now the pre-eminent social issue of the 21st century, and that a new vision and political movement is needed. Derber’s research is oriented toward 1) the systemic analysis of the intertwined crises we face and 2) analysis of the transformative potential of social movements arising to create a more democratic and egalitarian order.

Early life and education
Derber was born in Washington DC in January 1944, the son of New Deal economist Milton Derber.  Evenings in the Derber household included dinner discussions of politics and economics, imprinting a New Deal ideological framework upon young Derber. Reaching adulthood in the 1960s, Derber buried himself within the works of Karl Marx and Herbert Marcuse while in jail for protesting the Vietnam War. He attended Yale University, where he graduated with a bachelor of arts degree in 1965 and was a member of Manuscript Society. He then studied at the University of Chicago where he earned a PhD in sociology.

Career
Derber began teaching at Brandeis University in 1970 and switched to Boston College in 1980. He became a professor in 1991 and has been teaching in the graduate program on social economy and social justice ever since.
He is a prolific author, having published 25 books, translated into 14 languages, with several best-selling works.

Derber's work falls into three major categories. One is a critique of individualism and American culture. His 1980 book The Pursuit of Attention focuses on ego-centeredness and "conversational narcissism" in everyday life as structured by class, gender and America’s individualistic culture. In 2000, Oxford University Press printed a 20th year commemorative edition of the book. The Wilding of America, in its sixth edition, is a widely used text in American sociology. It offers a sharp critique of the American Dream and the crisis of hyper-individualism.
  	
Derber is best known to the general public for his analysis of corporate power and globalization. His book Corporation Nation is a study of how corporations penetrate and control every sector of American life. People Before Profit, a treatment of corporate globalization and its alternatives, has been published in five languages.

His books, Regime Change Begins at Home and Hidden Power, deal with the marriage of political and economic power in America. It is an early treatment of corporate regimes and how they can degrade into fascism, a theme of his later books, "Moving Beyond Fear" and "Glorious Causes," both co-authored with Yale Magrass. In 2006, the Independent Publisher Book Award (IPPY) nominated Hidden Power as one of the three best American books on current events.
	
Derber's interests evolved to focus on ideology and political morality, as well as the new dynamics of global capitalism and of the movements, such as the Occupy Movement, that challenge it. His 2008 book, Morality Wars, analyzes hegemonic discourses from the Roman Empire to the present. It also examines religious and "born again" ideologies, from German fascism to contemporary evangelical politics in the United States. Another 2008 book, with Katherine Adam, The New Feminized Majority, examines the gendered character of values and politics in America. It shows that a new electoral majority has embraced progressive values historically associated with women, values now shared by millions of men.

In 2010, Derber published Greed to Green: Solving Climate Change and Remaking the Economy (Paradigm Publishers, 2010), that shows that climate change is a symptom of a dysfunctional lifestyle that can be solved only through a transformation of American capitalism and neo-liberal globalization. He argues that we are seeing a third wave environmentalism that is inseparable from the broader social and economic justice movements. In 2011, he published Marx's Ghost: Midnight Conversations on Changing the World, also translated also into Korean and Chinese. In an imaginative encounter, Derber engages Marx's ghost in a provocative conversation about today's crises, relying extensively on Marx's own quotations. Turning to a genre of literary social science, based on conversation, Derber lays out alternative visions and political strategies for movements such as the Occupy Movement.

Derber's 2012 book The Surplus American: How the 1% Is Making Us Redundant, co-authored with Yale Magrass, continues Derber's evolution into new genres of political writing. The Surplus American features not only a careful analysis of "surplus people", those without jobs or any meaningful place in society, but a concluding play already performed at Boston College. The book describes a dystopia in 2020, where the majority of Americans have been rendered redundant through outsourcing, technological change and a corporate strategy to abandon the entire US economic infrastructure. While first drafted before the rise of the Occupy Movement the analysis is structured around a confrontation on Wall Street between financial elites and surplus people protesters.

In 2013, Derber published his book, "Sociopathic Society" with Paradigm Publishers. He shows how a society can be based on anti-social values, leading toward violence, fascism and sociocide. He argues that today's hyper-individualistic version of the American Dream, the master cultural script of US capitalism, is helping fuel all these perils in the US today.

Derber's 2017 book is Welcome to the Revolution: Universalizing Resistance for Social Justice. It explores the anti-Trump resistance movement and the anti-systemic universalizing movement needed to transform contemporary militarized capitalism. In conjunction with that book, Derber has brought together leaders of unions and many social justice movement, to analyze where we go from here. With Routledge Publishers, Derber is editing a new Universalizing Resistance Book Series where leading critical public intellectuals and activists analyze and flesh out stories of mass anti-systemic resistance that moves beyond the siloes of our current identity politics in our Left and Progressive movements. Derber is also helping direct a series of films and books about and with Noam Chomsky, funded by the Wallace Action Fund. His most recent book, forthcoming in 2023, is "Dying for Capitalism: How Big Money Is Fueling Extinction - and What We Can Do About It" wth Suren Moodliar; the book analyzes corporate capitalism, climate change and militarism as a deadly "triangle of extinction" and offers a novel approach to combating it. He is also working on new book focusing on the history and future of fascism and democracy in the US.
 	
Derber is known as a public sociologist who writes for general audiences, offering not only sociological critiques but alternative visions. He appears frequently on talk shows, has written opinion pieces for media including the International Herald Tribune, the Boston Globe, the Christian Science Monitor, Newsday, and Tikkun and Truthout. His interviews on Youtube, called "Failings of the Left" and "Security Tales," with Chris Hedges, have gotten wide attention. He champions the sociological imagination conceived by sociologist C. Wright Mills, and, like Mills, he believes in the importance of melding critical scholarship with social justice activism.

Personal life
Derber has long been active in the peace, environmental and labor movements, from his 1960s work to register African-American voters in the Mississippi Freedom Democratic Party and his opposition to the Vietnam War to current movements such as Occupy and the struggle to prevent climate change and transform global corporate capitalism into a robust economic and political democracy.

Works

References

External links
 Interview with Chris Hedges, On Contact
 Charles Derber discusses Sociology, Noam Chomsky and the media

1944 births
Living people
American political writers
American male non-fiction writers
American sociologists
Boston College faculty
Yale University alumni
University of Chicago alumni
Narcissism writers
American anti-war activists
Anti-corporate activists